The following is a list of WBC female world champions certificated by the World Boxing Council (WBC).

Stand: June 3, 2020.

r – Champion relinquished title.
s – Champion stripped of title.

On July 30, 2011, Ana María Torres won the first female Diamond Belt by defeating Jackie Nava at Bantamweight.

On October 13, 2012, Ava Knight won the Diamond Belt at Flyweight, decisioning Mariana Juárez. On May 11, 2013, she defended this title against Linda Soto from Mexico by unanimous decision.

On January 14, 2017, Amanda Serrano beat Yazmín Rivas to become the Diamond Champion at Super bantamweight.

On September 30, 2017, Jessica Chávez beat Esmeralda Moreno to win the vacant WBC female Diamond flyweight title.

On September 14, 2018, German Raja Amasheh won the vacant WBC Diamond super flyweight title against Peruvian Linda Laura Lecca.

On April 13, 2019, Claressa Shields won the vacant Diamond middleweight title via UD against Christina Hammer.

On October 30, 2021, Jackie Nava won the vacant Diamond super bantamweight title via UD against Mariana Juárez.

Atomweight

Strawweight

Light flyweight

Flyweight

Super flyweight

Bantamweight

Super bantamweight

Featherweight

Super featherweight

Lightweight

Super lightweight

Welterweight

Super welterweight

Middleweight

Super middleweight

Heavyweight

See also

 List of current female world boxing champions
 List of female undisputed world boxing champions
 List of WBA female world champions
 List of IBF female world champions
 List of WBO female world champions
 List of WIBO world champions

References

Female
Women's boxing
WBC
WBC